Perry is a village in Pike County, Illinois, United States. The population was 397 at the 2010 census.

Geography
Perry is located at  (39.782493, -90.744990).

History
Perry was the birthplace of Mary Baird Bryan, wife of William Jennings Bryan, and the earliest known presentation of Bryan's famous 'Cross of Gold' speech was at a church social at the Perry Presbyterian Church.  The text of the speech was printed in the local newspaper, now long-defunct.

It is named for Commodore Oliver Hazard Perry, the hero of the Battle of Lake Erie.

Demographics

As of the census of 2000, there were 437 people, 198 households, and 120 families residing in the village. The racial makeup of the village was 98.86% White, 0.23% Asian, and 0.92% from two or more races.

There were 198 households, out of which 25.8% had children under the age of 18 living with them, 52.5% were married couples living together, 5.6% had a female householder with no husband present, and 38.9% were non-families. 35.4% of all households were made up of individuals, and 23.2% had someone living alone who was 65 years of age or older. The average household size was 2.21 and the average family size was 2.89.

In the village, the population was spread out, with 23.8% under the age of 18, 5.3% from 18 to 24, 22.7% from 25 to 44, 21.7% from 45 to 64, and 26.5% who were 65 years of age or older. The median age was 44 years. For every 100 females, there were 83.6 males. For every 100 females age 18 and over, there were 85.0 males.

The median income for a household in the village was $26,458, and the median income for a family was $35,750. Males had a median income of $27,083 versus $19,375 for females. The per capita income for the village was $20,383. About 18.2% of families and 24.4% of the population were below the poverty line, including 33.3% of those under age 18 and 22.1% of those age 65 or over.

References

Villages in Pike County, Illinois
Villages in Illinois